The Lombardi LM.5 Aviastar was a two-seat light aircraft produced in Italy shortly after the Second World War, followed by a three-seat version called the LM.7.

LM.5 Design and construction
It was a low wing, cantilever monoplane of conventional design and mixed construction. The main units of the tailwheel undercarriage were retractable, and the cabin was fully enclosed, offering side-by-side seating. The Italian press of the day nicknamed it Topolino dell'Aria ("Little mouse of the air").

Operational history
An LM.5 (registration HB-UEM) was piloted to victory in the 1949 Tour Aerien de Suisse by Walter Spahni. The same year, however, the Lombardi firm ceased business, unable to sell its designs in the post-war marketplace. Only five examples of the LM.5 and two of the LM.7 had been built.

The LM.5 prototype (registered I-PIER, after its designer) was restored by Ali Romantiche at Sandigliano.

LM.7 design and construction
The two Lombardi LM.7 aircraft were completed in 1949 and had a lengthened cabin accommodating two seats in the front with a single rear seat. The starboard and rear seats may be removed for the carriage of light freight.  Ali Romantiche has also commenced the restoration of the LM.7 prototype (registration I-TTEN).

Variants
 LM.5 - two-seat version with CNA D or Continental C90 engine
 LM.7 - three-seat version with Praga or Walter Minor engine

Specifications (LM.5)

Notes

References

External links

 Ali Romantiche's historical archive on the LM.5 and photo gallery of the restored aircraft
 Ali Romantiche's historical archive on the LM.7 and photo gallery of the restoration underway

Lombardi aircraft
1940s Italian civil utility aircraft
Low-wing aircraft
Single-engined tractor aircraft
Aircraft first flown in 1945